Inuktun is the language of approximately 1,000 indigenous Inughuit (Polar Inuit), inhabiting the world's northernmost settlements in Qaanaaq and the surrounding villages in northwestern Greenland.

Geographic distribution
Apart from the town of Qaanaaq, Inuktun is also spoken in the villages of (Inuktun names in brackets) Moriusaq (Muriuhaq), Siorapaluk (Hiurapaluk), Qeqertat (Qikiqtat), Qeqertarsuaq (Qikiqtarhuaq), and Savissivik (Havighivik).

Classification 
The language is an Eskimo–Aleut language and dialectologically it is in between the Greenlandic language (Kalaallisut) and the Canadian Inuktitut, Inuvialuktun or Inuinnaqtun. The language differs from Kalaallisut by some phonological, grammatical and lexical differences.

History 
The Polar Inuit were the last to cross from Canada into Greenland and they may have arrived as late as in the 18th century. 
The language was first described by the explorers Knud Rasmussen and Peter Freuchen who travelled through northern Greenland in the early 20th century and established a trading post in 1910 at Dundas (Uummannaq) near Pituffik.

Current situation
Inuktun does not have its own orthography and is not taught in schools. However, most of the inhabitants of Qaanaaq and the surrounding villages use Inuktun in their everyday communication.

All speakers of Inuktun also speak Standard Greenlandic and many also speak Danish and a few also English.

Phonology and orthography
There is no official way to transcribe Inuktun. This article uses the orthography of Michael Fortescue, which deliberately reflects the close connection between Inuktun and Inuktitut

Vowels
The vowels are the same as in other Inuit dialects: /i/, /u/ and /a/

There are two diphthongs: /ai/ and /au/, which have been assimilated in West Greenlandic  to /aa/ (except for final /ai/)

Consonants
The most notable phonological difference from West Greenlandic is the debuccalization of West Greenlandic /s/ to /h/ (often pronounced [ç]) except for geminate [sː] (from earlier /ss/ or /vs/). Inuktun also allows more consonant clusters than Kalaallisut, 
namely ones with initial /k/, /ŋ/, /ɣ/, /q/ or /ʁ/. Older or conservative speakers also still have clusters with initial /p/, /m/ or /v/. Younger speakers have gone further in reducing old clusters, with also /k/, /ŋ/ and /ɣ/ being assimilated to the following consonant.

Comparison with West Greenlandic

Notes

References

Fortescue, Michael, 1991, Inuktun: an introduction to the language of Qaanaaq, Thule, Institut for Eskimologi 15, Københavns Universitet

External links
 Pax Leonard, Stephen. "Scientist lives with Arctic Innuguit for a year to document and help save disappearing language." The Guardian.

Greenlandic language
Endangered Eskaleut languages
Inuit languages
Inughuit
Languages of Greenland
Agglutinative languages
Indigenous languages of the North American Arctic